Kandiah Ulaganathan, also known as Colonel Ramanan, was a senior commander of the Tamil Tigers, and was the number two in the Tamil Tiger military wing and its chief intelligence operative in the eastern region. He was from Palukamam, Batticaloa District, Sri Lanka.

Early life
Ulganathan was born in 1966 in Palugaamam to a family of farmers. He studied at the Kandumani Maha Vidyalam. He joined the LTTE in 1986, a year before his brother joined. His brother was killed in a skirmish with the IPKF in 1987.

Death
Colonel Ramanan was killed by a sniper along Vavunathivu forward defence line on 21 May 2006. Tamilnet claimed the sniper was connected to the Sri Lankan Army, while military forces claimed was ambushed by members of the Tamil Makkal Viduthalai Pulikal. They allegedly ambushed him as he was riding a motorcycle. They attempted to detonate a mine, which failed, leading to his demise at the hand of gunshots.

See also
Notable assassinations of the Sri Lankan Civil War

References

1966 births
2006 deaths
Assassinated Sri Lankan people
Liberation Tigers of Tamil Eelam members
Sri Lankan Tamil rebels
People from Batticaloa District
Indian Peace Keeping Force